The Tokyo Bowl is an annual American college football bowl game, usually played in December in Tokyo, Japan. The game matches up the 2nd place team from the Kansai Collegiate American Football League and the 2nd place team from the Kantoh Collegiate American Football Association.

Game results

References

External links
  (Japanese)
 https://www.facebook.com/bowl.tokyo/

American football in Japan
Annual sporting events in Japan
College football bowls